Uttar Falguni is a 1963 Indian Bengali-language drama film directed by Asit Sen and produced by Uttam Kumar, starring Suchitra Sen in a double role, Bikash Roy and Dilip Mukherjee in lead. At the 11th National Film Awards, the film was awarded the National Film Award for Best Feature Film in Bengali. Music of the film composed by Robin Chatterjee. The film was remade by director Asit Sen himself in Hindi, as Mamta (1966) again with Suchitra Sen as the lead. The film was also remade in Tamil as Kaviya Thalaivi (1970), and in Malayalam as Pushpanjali (1972).

Plot

Cast 
 Suchitra Sen as Debjani / Pannabai and Suparna
 Bikash Roy  as Manish Roy
 Chhaya Devi  as Baijee
 Dilip Mukherjee as Indranil
 Padmadevi as Indranil's mother
 Kalipada Chakraborty as Rakhalbabu
 Pahari Sanyal as Barrister
 Jahar Ganguli as Debjani's father
 Sita Mukherjee as Mother Mary
 Ajit Bandyopadhyay
 Renuka Roy

Soundtrack

Reception
This is the fourth film produced by Uttam Kumar but for the first time he not acted in his home production he gave the chance to Bikash Roy for the story conditions and audiences perspective. The film became blockbuster hit at the box office and ran for 105 days in theater.

Awards
1964: National Film Award for Best Feature Film in Bengali - Uttam Kumar (As producer)
1964: BFJA Best Actress Award - Suchitra Sen

Remakes
The film was remade in Hindi in 1966 as Mamta where Asit Sen directed again and Suchitra Sen reprised her role. Later the film remade in Tamil as Kaviya Thalaivi in 1970 and in Malayalam as Pushpanjali in 1972.

References

External links 
 

1960s Bengali-language films
1963 films
Bengali films remade in other languages
Best Bengali Feature Film National Film Award winners
Bengali-language Indian films
Films based on works by Nihar Ranjan Gupta
Films scored by Robin Chatterjee